The Abraham Tichner House is a house located in southwest Portland, Oregon listed on the National Register of Historic Places.

See also
 National Register of Historic Places listings in Southwest Portland, Oregon

References

Houses on the National Register of Historic Places in Portland, Oregon
Houses completed in 1915
Neoclassical architecture in Oregon
1915 establishments in Oregon
Southwest Portland, Oregon
Portland Historic Landmarks
1910s architecture in the United States